Jochen Strobl (born 24 February 1979) is an Italian skier. He competed in the Nordic combined event at the 2006 Winter Olympics.

References

External links
 

1979 births
Living people
Italian male Nordic combined skiers
Olympic Nordic combined skiers of Italy
Nordic combined skiers at the 2006 Winter Olympics
People from Innichen
Sportspeople from Südtirol